Brachiocephalic can refer to the following:

 The brachiocephalic artery supplies blood to the right arm, head and neck.
 The left and right brachiocephalic veins merge to form the superior vena cava, one of the primary pathways by which blood is returned to the heart.
 Brachiocephalic is not an alternate spelling but misspelling of brachycephalic, a grouping within the cephalic index describing "short headed" animals or persons.  A common use of this term is in describing pug-nosed dogs.